Finn Malmgren Fjord is a fjord in Orvin Land at Nordaustlandet, Svalbard, between Glenhalvøya and Bergstrømodden. A land tongue of 0.5 kilometers separates the fjord from Adlersparrefjorden. Finn Malmgrenfjorden is named after Arctic explorer Finn Malmgren.

References

Fjords of Svalbard
Nordaustlandet